John Bird may refer to:

Politics
John Bird (died c. 1445), MP for Marlborough
John Bird (MP for Derby), in 1459, MP for Derby
John Bird (MP for Bath) (by 1481–1542 or later), in 1529, MP for Bath
John Bird (MP for Coventry) (c. 1694–1771), MP for Coventry from 1734 to 1737
John James Bird (1844–1933), politician in Manitoba, Canada
John Bird (MEP) (1926–1997), one of the Members of the European Parliament 1989–94
John Bird (New York politician) (1768–1806), American politician
John "Bud" Bird ( born 1932), Canadian politician
John T. Bird (1829–1911), American Democratic Party politician and businessman

Sports
John Bird (footballer, born 1940), Welsh football player for Newport County
John Bird (footballer, born 1948), English football player and manager
John Bird (racing driver) (born 1926), Canadian rally driver
John Bird (rugby league), rugby league footballer of the 1930s

Others
John Bird (actor) (1936–2022), British actor and comedian
John Bird (astronomer) (1709–1776), British astronomer and instrument designer
John Bird (bishop) (died 1558), British Bishop of Chester
John Bird, Baron Bird (born 1946), founder of The Big Issue
John E. Bird (1862–1928), member of the Michigan Supreme Court, 1910–1928
John Bird (artist) (1768–1829), Welsh landscape artist
John Bird (scientist) (born 1955), Canadian engineer, set hang gliding record in 1982
John M. Bird, commander of United States Seventh Fleet

See also
John Berde (disambiguation)